The 2017 UNOH 200 was the 14th stock car race of the 2017 NASCAR Camping World Truck Series and the 20th iteration of the event. The race was held on Wednesday, August 16, 2017, in Bristol, Tennessee, at Bristol Motor Speedway a 0.533 miles (0.858 km) permanent oval-shaped racetrack. The race was extended from its scheduled 200 laps to 203 due to a NASCAR overtime finish. At race's end, Kyle Busch, driving for Kyle Busch Motorsports, would manage to overcome a penalty during the final stage to win his 49th career NASCAR Camping World Truck Series win and his third and final win of the season. To fill out the podium, Matt Crafton of ThorSport Racing and John Hunter Nemechek of NEMCO Motorsports would finish second and third, respectively.

Background 

The Bristol Motor Speedway, formerly known as Bristol International Raceway and Bristol Raceway, is a NASCAR short track venue located in Bristol, Tennessee. Constructed in 1960, it held its first NASCAR race on July 30, 1961. Despite its short length, Bristol is among the most popular tracks on the NASCAR schedule because of its distinct features, which include extraordinarily steep banking, an all concrete surface, two pit roads, and stadium-like seating. It has also been named one of the loudest NASCAR tracks.

Entry list 

 (R) denotes rookie driver.
 (i) denotes driver who is ineligible for series driver points.

Practice

First practice 
The first practice session was held on Wednesday, August 16, at 9:00 AM EST, and would last for 55 minutes.

Second and final practice 
The second and final practice session, sometimes referred to as Happy Hour, was held on Wednesday, August 16, at 11:00 AM EST, and would last for 55 minutes.

Qualifying 
Qualifying was held on Wednesday, August 16, at 4:35 PM EST. Since Bristol Motor Speedway is under , the qualifying system was a multi-car system that included three rounds. The first round was 15 minutes, where every driver would be able to set a lap within the 15 minutes. Then, the second round would consist of the fastest 24 cars in Round 1, and drivers would have 10 minutes to set a lap. Round 3 consisted of the fastest 12 drivers from Round 2, and the drivers would have 5 minutes to set a time. Whoever was fastest in Round 3 would win the pole.

Two drivers would fail to qualify: Chris Windom and Mike Senica.

Full qualifying results

Race results 
Stage 1 Laps: 55

Stage 2 Laps: 55

Stage 3 Laps: 90

Standings after the race 

Drivers' Championship standings

Note: Only the first 8 positions are included for the driver standings.

References 

2017 NASCAR Camping World Truck Series
NASCAR races at Bristol Motor Speedway
August 2017 sports events in the United States
2017 in sports in Tennessee